Gerettet is a sculpture by Adolf Brütt, installed in the Kolonnadenhof outside the Alte Nationalgalerie in Berlin, Germany.

References

External links

 

Outdoor sculptures in Germany
Sculptures of men in Germany
Sculptures of women in Germany
Statues in Germany